"Sweet Little Sixteen" is a rock and roll song written and first recorded by Chuck Berry, who released it as a single in January 1958. His performance of it at that year's Newport Jazz Festival was included in the documentary film Jazz on a Summer's Day. It reached number two on the Billboard Hot 100, one of two of Berry's second-highest positions—along with Johnny Rivers cover of "Memphis, Tennessee"—on that chart (surpassed only by his suggestive hit "My Ding-A-Ling", which reached number one in 1972). "Sweet Little Sixteen" also reached number one on the R&B Best Sellers chart. In the UK, it reached number 16 on the UK Official Charts. Rolling Stone magazine ranked the song number 272 on its list of the "500 Greatest Songs of All Time" in 2004. He used the same melody on an earlier song, "The Little Girl From Central" recorded on Checkmate in 1955.

Personnel
Recorded December 29–30, 1957
 Chuck Berry – vocals and guitar
 Lafayette Leake – piano
 Willie Dixon – bass
 Fred Below – drums

"Surfin' U.S.A."

The Beach Boys' 1963 song "Surfin' U.S.A." features lyrics by Brian Wilson set to the music of "Sweet Little Sixteen." Under pressure from Berry's publisher, Wilson's father and manager, Murry Wilson, gave the copyright, including Brian Wilson's lyrics, to Arc Music.

The Beatles' version
The Beatles recorded the song once for the Pop Go The Beatles radio show on 10 July 1963 at the Aeolian Hall, London. It remained unreleased until Live at the BBC in 1994.

Personnel
John Lennon – vocals, rhythm guitar
George Harrison – lead guitar
Paul McCartney – bass
Ringo Starr – drums

John Lennon version
John Lennon recorded a cover version of "Sweet Little Sixteen" for his 1975 album of cover versions, Rock 'n' Roll. His version was produced by Phil Spector, and was recorded between 17 October and 14 December 1973. Spector cut the tempo of the song and gave it the full Wall of Sound treatment, and Lennon turned in one of his most passionate vocal performances. While it has a running time of 3:01, it has fewer verses than Berry's original version, being slower and more bluesy than the original.

References

Songs about teenagers
1958 songs
1958 singles
Songs written by Chuck Berry
Chuck Berry songs
The Beatles songs
John Lennon songs
Chess Records singles
The Crickets songs